Arroyo Salado is a town in María Trinidad Sánchez Province of the Dominican Republic.

Sources 
World Gazeteer: Dominican Republic – World-Gazetteer.com

Populated places in María Trinidad Sánchez Province